A Nation of Sheep may refer to books by
William Lederer in 1961
Andrew Napolitano in 2007